The Fitzroy River turtle (Rheodytes leukops) is a species of freshwater turtle in the family Chelidae. It is the only surviving member of the genus Rheodytes, the other member being the extinct form Rheodytes devisi. The species is endemic to south eastern Queensland, Australia and only found in tributaries of the Fitzroy River.

Description
The Fitzroy River turtle is light to dark brown in color and grows to approximately 260 mm in carapace length. The shells of hatchlings (up to 95 mm long) are highly serrated while adults have rounded, smooth-edged shells. The plastron is lighter in color and tapers anteriorly and posteriorly. The carapace is highly reticulated to the naked eye, but this resolves as a series of parallel ridges with occasional cross ridging under low magnification. The plastron is smooth. The scutes are very thin and underlying sutures in both the carapace and plastron are visible through them in all but the darkest individuals. Pictured in the box is a carapace of a sub-adult Rheodytes leukops (242 mm length) showing the very visible sutures that can be seen through the scutes, still in place. The species, and in fact the genus, can also be identified by its very thin carapace bones, a character used in diagnosing the related fossil species Rheodytes devisi. The upper surfaces of their necks are scattered with blunt to pointed conical skin tubercles that do not appear to have any specialized follicular centres (Legler and Winokur, 1979). The species has a single pair of barbels on the lower jaw. The Fitzroy River turtle is capable of obtaining up to 70% of its oxygen needs from the water through its cloaca, in a process called cloacal respiration. This allows the Fitzroy River turtle to remain underwater for up to three weeks.

Biology

Diet
This turtle is an adept bottom feeder, preying on terrestrial and aquatic insects, macroinvertebrates, crustaceans, algae, aquatic snails, worms, freshwater sponges and aquatic plants such as ribbon weed (Vallisneria sp.). Stomach flushing has demonstrated that most of the diet was made up of macroinvertebrates with some freshwater sponges.

Natural history and observations in the wild
This species shows a clear preference for fast flowing water (near sand banks for egg laying) and has been found at depths as shallow as 15 cm. In most encounters, they have been found lying still, hidden by overhanging plant foliage along the shallow banks of fast flowing riffles (fast flowing streams or rapids) and under logs. In all encounters their preferred substratum was noted as coarse river sand and gravel.

Breeding biology
There is limited sexual dimorphism with the tail of the female being cutely shorter than that of the male. The most accurate way to differentiate between sexes is to compare the distance between the anal scutes of the plastron and the cloacae. In males, the cloacae is located further away from the plastron than in females. Most other short-necked turtles in Australia show obvious differences in tail length and thickness. Multi-clutching is demonstrated in this species in the original study by Legler and Cann (1980) as corpora lutea, current eggs and enlarged follicles were present in the females, indicating at least 3 clutches. Anecdotal records since indicate up to 5 clutches may occur.

Conservation status
Their habitat comprises a total area of less than 10,000 km2, including the Fitzroy, Mackenzie and Dawson rivers. Its limited distribution and status as sole survivor of a once more widespread genus give it a high priority for conservation. The species has been listed as vulnerable on the IUCN checklist since 1994. The Fitzroy River turtle is commonly known as the "bum breathing turtle". This nickname is derived from their unusual ability to absorb oxygen whilst submerged through highly vascularized bursae located in the cloaca. Rheodytes leukops is a bimodally respiring turtle that extracts oxygen from the water chiefly via two enlarged cloacal bursae that are lined with multi-branching papillae (Priest and Franklin, 2002). Therefore, reductions in aquatic oxygen levels, particularly by agriculture and dams, reduces survivorship among juvenile classes. Three major impacts on the species have been identified; the reduction in invertebrate prey; conversion of fluvial to lacustrine habitat; and the increase of sedimentation impacting the cloacal breathing mode (Tucker et al. 2001) Hence it is listed as vulnerable under both the Environment Protection and Biodiversity Conservation Act (EPBC Act 1999) and the Queensland Nature Conservation Act, 1992. The IUCN currently flags this species as in need of review.

References

Rheodytes
Reptiles described in 1980
Taxonomy articles created by Polbot
Turtles of Australia